UEFA Challenge is a football video game for PlayStation, PlayStation 2 and Microsoft Windows, developed by Infogrames Sheffield House and published by Infogrames Europe in 2001.

Gameplay
This game is under an authorised UEFA licence which includes biggest football teams and players, who have their own playing techniques. The system is comparable to many games when players select from friendlies, tournaments and leagues (complete with promotion and relegation battles), they take guidance of the team and play their way through to the top.

Competitions
 Club Challenge
  European Club Cup
  European Trophy
  European Mini Leagues
 Season
 Tournament

Teams
United Kingdom

  Arsenal
  Aston Villa
  Chelsea
  Everton
  Rangers
  Celtic
  Leeds United
  Liverpool
  Manchester United
  Heart of Midlothian
  Newcastle United
  Tottenham Hotspur
  West Ham United

Western Europe

  A.C. Milan
  AC Parma
  Saint-Étienne
  Auxerre
  Bologna
  Bordeaux
  Fiorentina
  Internazionale
  Juventus
  Lens
  Lyon
  Monaco
  Marseille
  Nantes
  Paris SG
  A.S. Roma
  S.S. Lazio
  Udinese Calcio

Western Europe

  1860 Munich
  Ajax
  Bayer Leverkusen
  Bayern Munich
  Hertha Berlin
  Werder Bremen
  Club Brugge
  Dortmund
  Feyenoord
  Hamburg
  Heerenveen
  Kaiserslautern
  Schalke 04
  Stuttgart
  Standard Liège
  PSV Eindhoven
  Anderlecht
  Antwerp
  Sturm Graz
  Rapid Vienna
  Vitesse
  Willem II

Iberian Peninsula

  Alavés
  Bilbao
  Barcelona
  Boavista
  Porto
  La Coruña
  Espanyol
  Sporting Lisbon
  Málaga
  Mallorca
  Rayo Vallecano
  Madrid
  Benfica
  Real Sociedad
  Valencia
  Celta de Vigo
  Real Zaragoza

Rest of Europe

  AEK Athens
  AIK Fotboll
  Beşiktaş
  Brondby
  Dynamo Kyiv
  Galatasaray
  Gotherburg
  Helsingborg
  Fenerbahçe
  Hajduk Split
  HJK Helsinki
  Spartak Moscow
  Olympiacos
  Panathinaikos
  Maribor
  Sparta Prague
  Slavia Prague
  Molde FK
  Rosenborg BK
  Steaua Bucharest
  Shakhtar Donetsk
  Levski Sofia
  Legia Warsaw
  Dinamo Zagreb
  Grasshopper Zürich

Bonus Team
  European All-Star Team
 World All-Star Team
  European Legends XI
 World Legends XI
National Teams

Stadiums
There are 30 stadiums which include:
 
  Old Trafford, Manchester
  Anfield, Liverpool
  Highbury, London
  Stamford Bridge, London
  Nou Camp, Barcelona
  Stadio delle Alpi, Turin
  Santiago Bernabéu Stadium, Madrid
  Estádio da Luz, Lisboa
  Stadio Olimpico, Rome
  De Kuip, Rotterdam
  San Siro, Milan
  Stade Vélodrome, Marseille
  Parc des Princes, Paris
  Kyiv Olympic Stadium, Kyiv
  Westfalenstadion, Dortmund
  Stadio Piemontese, Torino
  Green Meadows, England
  Metropolitan Stadium, England
  Mediterranean Stadium, Spain

References

External links
 
 UEFA Challenge at GameSpot (PC)

2001 video games
Association football video games
Europe-exclusive video games
Gremlin Interactive games
Infogrames games
PlayStation (console) games
PlayStation 2 games
Windows games
Video games developed in the United Kingdom